Conker: Live & Reloaded is a platform video game developed by Rare and exclusively released for the Xbox in June 2005. The single-player mode is a remaster of the 2001 game Conker's Bad Fur Day for the Nintendo 64. However, it includes a new multiplayer mode using Xbox Live that is different from the Nintendo 64 version. Development started the moment the studio was bought by Microsoft in 2002. The game was made available as a part of Xbox One's backwards compatibility program on April 17, 2018.

Gameplay 
In terms of the single-player, the gameplay and plot is identical to Conker's Bad Fur Day. Differences are very few, including enemies and new weapons like a baseball bat with a nail in it.

Plot

Multiplayer 
The Multiplayer in Live & Reloaded uses the same third-person perspective as the single-player game. Multiplayer consists of different game modes such as Capture the Flag or the standard Deathmatch modes. The player may participate as a member of the SHC or the Tediz. As well as a choice of a soldier, the game has a choice of "classes" which significantly affect play style.

Each class has its own special equipment, special abilities, and physical capabilities, each being designed for a distinct purpose. They are also designed to have advantages against certain classes while being vulnerable to others. For example, the Thermophile's flamethrower inflicts extreme damage on s and Long Rangers, who have less health, but is virtually useless against the high-vitality Demolisher. Each class comes equipped with a primary weapon with unlimited ammunition (although reloading of the weapon is still required), a limited stock of grenades, and at least one special ability. Each class can also choose from several specialist ordnance items and vehicles unique to the class, which can be obtained at stations in team bases (however, an option is available to the host of a server to disable one or both features). Abilities common to all classes are the ability to shoulder all weapons for extra running speed, and a Spray Can that can be used to apply the player's avatar image to walls to mock human opponents.  Scattered throughout the arenas are yellow Upgrade Orbs, which grant a player more equipment and abilities when obtained. A player loses his upgrade orb upon death, allowing another player to obtain it.

Terminals are found in every mission, usually near a base. Terminals are computers that dispense useful items or vehicles, and can be accessed by a player during the game. When accessed, the player is given a menu of the available items. When an item is chosen it can be picked up at an adjacent dispenser area. The objects received from the terminals disappear upon the death of the player that obtained them. Terminals may be neutral and available to both sides, or under the control of one side. Terminals can be attacked and disabled, but not destroyed. If damaged or disabled, they can be repaired with an arc weld, issued to the Demolisher and Sky Jockey classes. Neutral or enemy-controlled terminals can be hacked with a 's hacking device. There are two types of terminals: Specialist Ordinance terminals, and Mobile Units terminals.

Background 
Conker’s Bad Fur Day (2001) was one of the last Nintendo 64 titles, released just after the debut of PlayStation 2 and shortly before the launches of the GameCube and Xbox. However, the game's adult humor and satire on most platformers and adventure games affected Nintendo's reputation of being a family-friendly brand. However, the game was not an instant commercial success, attributable to its high price and being released near the end of the console's lifespan.

Censorship 
Development began in 2002, shortly after Microsoft bought Rare. The game was originally titled Conker: Live and Uncut and was to feature a completely uncensored single-player experience. At some point during the development of the game, this was changed and the game was released with some censorship. The censorship included that of some obscenities which were present in the original N64 version (in which only the F-word and its variations were bleeped out). This drew criticism from fans of the original, especially as it detracted from comedic highlights such as the "Great Mighty Poo" song in the Sloprano chapter. This song was also censored on the soundtrack, although Rare once had the uncensored Xbox version of the song on their website.

Like the original, the game was rated M by the ESRB and carried warnings about its content as well as Rare's promotional spoof warnings that advertised the fact that the content of the game was explicitly 'adult'.

Reception

Conker: Live & Reloaded was received positively by critics for its presentation and graphics. The game was named IGN's "Best of E3 2005" in the category of "Best Graphics" for Xbox.

GameZone praised Conker: Live & Reloaded for improving on Conker's Bad Fur Day in many ways, such as controls, camera, and graphics. The review noted "a new targeting system that takes advantage of strafing and feels very comfortable on the Xbox controller". On the other hand, IGN criticized for changes to the single player campaign compared to the original, such as the removal of certain challenges, and the lack of refinement in areas such as facial animation that was perfected on the Nintendo 64.

IGN didn't find the new multiplayer to be as fun as the original. The multiplayer mode (new in this version of the game) remained popular well into 2007 (over a year and a half since its release) when it remained in the top 10 most played online titles for its platform.

Maxim gave it a perfect ten and stated that, "up to 16 people can torch each other. It's more of everything you loved (and decent people protested)." The New York Times gave it a favorable review, stating, "The game is essentially a burlesque of every game featuring cute forest creatures. It has the sort of platform-jumping, rope-climbing, monster-whomping challenges seen in many of these games, but adds foulmouthed animals, scatological humor and gallons of vividly scarlet cartoon blood."  The Sydney Morning Herald gave it four stars out of five and said, "The potty humour will not be to everyone's taste but many films are hilariously lampooned."  However, Jim Schaefer of Detroit Free Press gave it three stars out of four and said that he found it "amusing to relive some of Conker's bawdy behavior, but I wish they would have come up with a new story rather than remaking the old one."  In Japan, Famitsu gave it a score of all four sevens, for a total of 28 out of 40.

References

Citations

Bibliography

External links

 

2005 video games
3D platform games
Conker (series)
Dinosaurs in video games
Microsoft games
Multiplayer online games
Multiplayer and single-player video games
Parody video games
Rare (company) games
Video games about vampires
Censored video games
Video game remakes
Video game sequels
Video games scored by Robin Beanland
War video games
Xbox games
Xbox-only games
Xbox One X enhanced games
Video games about zombies
Video games developed in the United Kingdom